Roell or Röell is a given name and surname that may refer to

Surname
Godfried Roëll (1908–1934), Dutch rower
Joan Röell (1844–1914), Dutch nobleman, lawyer and statesman
Werner Roell (1914–2008), German Luftwaffe officer

Given name
Roell Preston (born 1972), American football player